Larry Duff is the name of:

 Larry Mac Duff (born 1948), American football coach
 Father Larry Duff, fictional sitcom character